Why Do Fools Fall in Love is a 1998 American romantic drama film directed by Gregory Nava. Released by Warner Bros. Pictures, the film is a biographical film of R&B/Rock and roll singer Frankie Lymon, lead singer of the pioneering rock and roll group Frankie Lymon & the Teenagers for one year. Moreover, the film highlights the three women in his life, each of whom claim to have married Lymon and lay claim to his estate.

Written by Tina Andrews, Why Do Fools Fall in Love stars Halle Berry, Vivica A. Fox, Lela Rochon, and Larenz Tate, who portrays Lymon. Little Richard also appears in the film as himself.

One of the singles from the soundtrack, "I Want You Back" by Melanie Brown featuring Missy Elliott, peaked at number one in the UK Singles Chart.

Plot
Lymon was 13 years old when the teenage group Frankie Lymon & the Teenagers erupted from radios and jukeboxes with their 1956 hit "Why Do Fools Fall in Love?" and appeared in the movie Rock, Rock, Rock (1956).

After Mr. Rock and Roll (1957), Lymon started a solo singing career, but it all fell apart. Lymon's career was over by the time he was 18 years old, and he died of a heroin overdose seven years later.

Jumping from the 1950s to the 1960s, the film traces the rise and fall of Lymon (Larenz Tate) in a series of flashbacks as courtroom claims on Lymon's royalties are outlined by three women: Zola Taylor (Halle Berry) of the R&B group The Platters; Elizabeth Waters (Vivica A. Fox), a petty thief from Philadelphia; and schoolteacher Emira Eagle (Lela Rochon). Ending credits show the real Frankie Lymon singing his song "Goody Goody".

Little Richard also makes a courtroom appearance, while Miguel A. Nunez Jr. portrays Little Richard in scenes set in the 1950s.

The film ends with Emira winning Frankie's estate.

Cast

 Halle Berry as Zola Taylor
 Vivica A. Fox as Elizabeth "Mickey" Waters
 Lela Rochon as Emira Eagle
 Larenz Tate as Frankie Lymon
 Paul Mazursky as Morris Levy
 Pamela Reed as Judge Lambrey
 Alexis Cruz as Herman Santiago
 Jon Huertas as Joe Negroni
 David Barry Gray as Peter Markowitz
 Miguel A. Nunez Jr. as Young Little Richard

 Clifton Powell as Lawrence Roberts
 Lane Smith as Ezra Grahme
 Ben Vereen as Richard Barrett
 Paula Jai Parker as Paula King
 Marcello Thedford as Drug Dealer
 Norris Young as Jimmy
 Little Richard as himself
 Aries Spears as Redd Foxx
 J. August Richards as Sherman
 Shirley Caesar as minister/singer at funeral

Background
The screenplay of the film, written by actress-turned-screenwriter Tina Andrews, took fifteen years to be produced. Director Gregory Nava used most of the technical staff from his prior film Selena.

Filming locations
Filming locations include: Jacksonville, Florida; Los Angeles, California; and Starke, Florida.

Distribution
The film was first presented at the Urbanworld Film Festival, New York on August 8, 1998.

The film opened in wide release on August 28, 1998 (1,369 theaters) and sales the opening weekend were $3,946,382. Why Do Fools Fall in Love ran for 8 weeks domestically (56 days) and eventually grossed $12,506,676 in the United States. At its widest release the film was shown in 1,377 screens.

Reception

Critical response
On review aggregator website Rotten Tomatoes, the film holds an approval rating of 53% based on 57 reviews, with an average rating of 5.91/10. The website's critics consensus reads, "This is a fun comedy with delightful musical numbers." Roger Ebert, film critic for the Chicago Sun-Times, was disappointed in the screenplay and ultimately Nava's direction of the film, and wrote, "There are several angles this material might have been approached from, and director Gregory Nava tries several without hitting on one that works. By the end of the film, we're not even left with anyone to root for; we realize with a little astonishment, waiting for the court verdict, that we don't care who wins."

Yet, film critic Peter Stack liked the film and believes director Nava smartly juggles a lot of elements in the picture. He wrote, "Why Do Fools Fall in Love is a fresh, enlightening example of how to take a tragic American show-business story and make it funny, warm and terrifically entertaining...[it] brims with joyful spirit and raucous comedy...[and the film] deftly juggles a surprising number of elements, but they all work."

Accolades
Wins
 ALMA Award: Outstanding Latino Director of a Feature Film, Gregory Nava, 1999.
 American Black Film Festival: Black Film Award; Best Actor, Larenz Tate, 1999.

Nominations
 ALMA Awards: Outstanding Actor in a Feature Film in a Crossover Role, Miguel A. Núñez Jr.; Outstanding Actor in a Supporting Role in a Feature Film, Alexis Cruz, 1999.
 American Black Film Festival: Black Film Award; Best Screenplay, Tina Andrews; Best Soundtrack, 1999.

Soundtrack

Two soundtrack albums were released for Why Do Fools Fall in Love by Warner Music Group. Why Do Fools Fall in Love: Original Versions from the Movie, released on September 8, 1998 by Rhino Records, contained fourteen songs, including five of Frankie Lymon & the Teenagers' original recordings. Also included are original hits by Little Richard, The Platters, The Shirelles, Otis Redding and others.

Why Do Fools Fall in Love: Music from and Inspired by the Motion Picture was released on the same day as Original Versions from the Movie, but on Warner's East West Records label in conjunction with Elektra Records and The Goldmind Inc. Save for one vintage Little Richard song, it features new hip-hop and contemporary R&B recordings practically unrelated to the actual film (one track, Gina Thompson's "Why Do Fools Fall in Love", interpolates the Teenagers' hit and is featured over the film's end credits). Executive produced by Missy Elliott and primarily produced by her and Timbaland, this soundtrack album features songs by artists such as Elliott, Busta Rhymes, En Vogue, Destiny's Child, Coko of SWV and, making her solo debut, Spice Girls member Melanie B.

It peaked at 55 on the Billboard 200 and 15 on the Top R&B/Hip-Hop Albums and spawned the singles "I Want You Back" by Melanie Brown featuring Missy Elliott (which peaked at number-one on the UK Singles Chart), En Vogue's "No Fool No More" (which peaked at 57 on the Billboard Hot 100), and Destiny's Child's "Get on the Bus" (which peaked at 15 on the UK Singles Chart). Singer Lil' Mo also made her debut with the single and music video for "Five Minutes".

Former Bad Boy recording artist Mase was slated to record with Missy Elliott and Busta Rhymes for the soundtrack, but his contribution never made the final cut.

Track listing

References

External links
 
 
 
  
 
 

1998 films
1998 romantic drama films
1990s legal films
African-American drama films
American biographical drama films
American legal drama films
American rock music films
American romantic drama films
American romantic musical films
1990s English-language films
Films directed by Gregory Nava
Films scored by Stephen James Taylor
Films set in 1956
Films set in the 1960s
Films set in the 1980s
Films shot in Jacksonville, Florida
Musical films based on actual events
Romantic period films
Warner Bros. films
Rhino Films films
1990s American films